The Best American Poetry 2005, a volume in The Best American Poetry series, was edited by David Lehman and by guest editor Paul Muldoon.

The volume is "one of the series' best books in years", according to Maureen N. McLane, reviewing the book in The Chicago Tribune. "None of these poets is hermetic, but many are willing to challenge you as well as to entertain you. Poetry appears here as an art for grownups — not self-serious adults, but actually mature people who treasure serious play and complex comedy as much as filigreed melancholy." The selections clearly have not been chosen simply because the writer is well-known or in order to represent a certain style or group, she wrote. McLane mentioned particularly good selections by Cecilia Woloch, Catherine Bowman, Elaine Equi, Beth Ann Fennelly, Matthea Harvey, Donald Justice, Marilyn Hacker, and A. R. Ammons, as well as Stacey Harwood, whose poem parodies the extensive contributors notes section in the back of the book. Harwood is the wife of the series editor, David Lehman.

Poets and poems included

See also
 2005 in poetry

Notes

External links
 Web page for contents of the book, with links to each publication where the poems originally appeared
  "Play for Mortal Stakes" Marion K. Stocking's review in The Beloit Poetry Journal

Best American Poetry series
2005 poetry books
Poetry
American poetry anthologies